Roll Call is an album by jazz tenor saxophonist Hank Mobley. It features trumpeter Freddie Hubbard, pianist Wynton Kelly, bassist Paul Chambers, and drummer Art Blakey.

Track listing 
All compositions by Hank Mobley except as indicated.

 "Roll Call" - 10:33
 "My Groove Your Move" - 6:07
 "Take Your Pick" - 5:27
 "A Baptist Beat" - 8:54
 "The More I See You" (Warren, Gordon) - 6:47
 "The Breakdown" - 4:57
 "A Baptist Beat" [alternate take] - 9:42 Bonus track on CD

Personnel 
Hank Mobley - tenor saxophone
Freddie Hubbard - trumpet 
Wynton Kelly - piano
Paul Chambers - bass
Art Blakey - drums

References

1961 albums
Albums produced by Alfred Lion
Blue Note Records albums
Hank Mobley albums
Albums recorded at Van Gelder Studio